Alocasia sinuata, commonly known as Alocasia quilted dreams or Alocasia 'Bullata', is a flowering plant in the family Araceae. It is endemic to the limestone forests of Samar, Leyte, and parts of Mindanao in the Philippines. It is classified as critically endangered by the International Union for Conservation of Nature.

Distribution 
It is native to the Philippines.

Taxonomy 
It was described by Nicholas Edward Brown in The Gardeners' Chronicle in 1885.

See also
Alocasia micholitziana
Alocasia nycteris
Alocasia sanderiana
Alocasia zebrina
Alocasia heterophylla
List of threatened species of the Philippines

References

External links 

sinuata
Endemic flora of the Philippines
Flora of the Visayas
Critically endangered flora of Asia
Garden plants of Asia
House plants
Flora of Mindanao
Taxa named by N. E. Brown